The Joseph Monfils Farmstead is located in Brussels, Wisconsin.

History
The property belonged to John and Theresa Monfils, who operated a wheat farm. It was added to the State and the National Register of Historic Places in 2004.

References

Farms on the National Register of Historic Places in Wisconsin
National Register of Historic Places in Door County, Wisconsin
Late 19th and Early 20th Century American Movements architecture